The 1965 Louisville Cardinals football team was an American football team that represented the University of Louisville in the Missouri Valley Conference (MVC) during the 1965 NCAA University Division football season. In their 20th season under head coach Frank Camp, the Cardinals compiled a 6–4 record (2–1 against conference opponents) and outscored opponents by a total of 218 to 164.

The team's statistical leaders included Benny Russell with 1,791 passing yards, Wayne Patrick with 428 rushing yards, Mike Dennis with 587 receiving yards, and Al MacFarlane and Benny Russell with 48 points each.

Schedule

References

Louisville
Louisville Cardinals football seasons
Louisville Cardinals football